The Kenn Plateau is a large piece of submerged continental crust off northeastern Australia that rifted from northeastern Australia about 63-52 mya, along with other nearby parts of the Zealandia continent.

References
Kenn Plateau off northeast Australia: a continental fragment in the southwest Pacific jigsaw
Zealandia

Zealandia